Alucita bidentata is a moth of the family Alucitidae. It is found in France, Italy, Croatia, Bosnia and Herzegovina, the Republic of Macedonia and on Sardinia.

References

Moths described in 1994
Alucitidae
Moths of Europe